Stefano Lelio Beniamino Accorsi (born 2 March 1971) is an Italian actor.

Early life and background
Accorsi was born in Bologna. He graduated from Bologna's Theatrical School in 1993, and acted in the theatre for several years before moving to cinema.

Career
In 1995 he played the lead in Jack Frusciante è uscito dal gruppo, one of his best known films.

In 1998 he worked with Daniele Luchetti in I Piccoli Maestri, which competed for the Golden Lion at the Venice International Film Festival. In the same year he won three prizes for his role in Radiofreccia, directed by rock star Luciano Ligabue, including David di Donatello for Best Actor.

He was the lead in the successful film L'ultimo bacio (The Last Kiss).

He won the leading role in Maria de Medeiros’ Capitães de Abril (April Captains), and has worked with director Nanni Moretti in The Son's Room.

In 2001, Accorsi also had the leading role in Ferzan Özpetek's Le fate ignoranti (His Secret Life – Festival Title/The Ignorant Fairies – International Title), which was in competition at the 2001 Berlin International Film Festival. This film was a big success in Italy and in Turkey, and Accorsi, who played the role of a homosexual man, won three awards for his interpretation.

He also starred in David Blair's Tabloid TV (UK) and in Marco Ponti's Santa Maradona.

Then Accorsi acted in the TV film  by Giacomo Battiato.

His next film was Un viaggio chiamato amore (A Journey Called Love) which took part in the Venice International Film Festival 2002 and for which he won the Coppa Volpi, the award for best male performance as the Italian poet Dino Campana.

He didn't make any more films for about a year, during which time he went to France. He went to the Venice International Film Festival 2003 as a member of the jury. In 2004 he shot two movies: Ovunque sei, directed by Michele Placido, where he plays the role of an emergency care doctor; and L'amore ritrovato, directed by Carlo Mazzacurati.

Accorsi worked with Diane Kruger in Les Brigades du Tigre (2005) and with Julie Depardieu in La Faute à Fidel. He was featured in Un baiser s'il vous plaît in 2007 and its sequel Baciami ancora in 2010.

Personal life
Accorsi was engaged to Corsican supermodel Laetitia Casta. They have one son and one daughter together, Orlando, born on 21 September 2006 and Athena, born on 29 August 2009.

He is an agnostic.

Filmography

Films

Television

Music videos

Awards

References

External links
 
 Saverio Ferragina press agent
 Biography

1971 births
Living people
Actors from Bologna
Italian male film actors
Italian male television actors
Italian agnostics
David di Donatello winners
Nastro d'Argento winners
Ciak d'oro winners
Volpi Cup for Best Actor winners
20th-century Italian male actors
21st-century Italian male actors